Peter Roeck is a Canadian film and television editor. He is most noted for his work on the 2020 film The New Corporation: The Unfortunately Necessary Sequel, for which he was a Canadian Screen Award nominee for Best Editing in a Documentary at the 9th Canadian Screen Awards in 2021.

References

External links

Canadian film editors
Canadian television editors
Living people
Year of birth missing (living people)